is a Japanese pop and enka singer, and actress, best known as one of the original members of the all-female J-pop group Morning Musume. She is also a member of Japanese pop group Dream Morning Musume.

Biography 
Yuko Nakazawa was born in Kyoto Prefecture. She was one of five runners-up in a 1997 talent contest for a new Japanese rock idol. After the contest, musician and producer Tsunku offered Nakazawa and the four other runners-up (Natsumi Abe, Kaori Iida, Aya Ishiguro, and Asuka Fukuda) the chance to be taken under his wing under one condition: they must sell 50,000 CDs of their debut song "Ai no Tane" with five days of live promotion. The quintet accomplished that task in four and thus Morning Musume was born. The group has since grown increasingly popular, it maintains a "school-like" system for their continuous line-up changes, with older members "graduating" and new, usually younger, members selected from nationwide auditions admitted to the group almost annually.

In 1998, shortly after Morning Musume's formation, Nakazawa began a solo career, beginning with enka styled songs. She gradually moved to a more pop sound, but has recently gone back to enka with her eleventh single, "Urara." Her solo work has allowed her voice to shine in a way it rarely did in Morning Musume, as she mostly sung harmonies with only a few solo lines.

Nakazawa has been a regular featured singer on Hello! Project's "Folk Songs" series. She was also placed in Akagumi 4 in Hello! Project's 2000 summer shuffles and Puripuri Pink in Hello!Project's 2005 summer shuffles, as well as participating in H.P. All Stars along with most of the rest of Hello!Project in 2004.

Being the oldest of the 1st generation of Morning Musume—she was 24 at the time of formation and nearly 28 upon leaving the group—Nakazawa held the role of the group's leader until her graduation on April 15, 2001. She has cited her reasons for leaving as being her age (she was 14 years older than the youngest member of the troupe, then 13-year-old Ai Kago, at the time of her departure) and her desire to pursue other things by the time she was 30.

Since then, Nakazawa has done some work in Japanese dramas such as Beauty 7 and Home Maker, performed in various plays, and continued in her solo singing career at a steady pace with reasonable success. She worked closely with Morning Musume and hosted their weekly show Hello! Morning (first regularly, then occasionally), until its end in early 2007.

It was announced on October 19, 2008 by Hello! Project that Nakazawa, along with the rest of Elder Club will graduate from Hello! Project on March 31, 2009. On February 1, 2009, during the "Hello Pro Award '09 ~Elder Club Sotsugyō Kinen Special~" concert held at Yokohama Arena, Nakazawa passed on her leadership position in Hello! Project to Ai Takahashi of Morning Musume.

In 2010, it was announced Yuko Nakazawa will be joining the new group, "Dream Morning Musume" alongside other former-Morning Musume members.

Personal life
In March 2012, it was announced that Nakazawa had married an information technology company president one year her senior in a private ceremony. They have two little boys.

Discography

Albums

Singles

Videos / DVDs

Acts

Dramas

Variety shows

Movies

Radio shows 
 Nakazawa Yuko no All Night Nippon Super!
 Nakazawa Yuko no All Night Nippon Sunday Special → Nakazawa Yuko no All Night Nippon Sunday Super!
 Young Town Douyoubi
 Music Plaza's Kimama ni Classic
 Maji Asa!

Commercials 
 Elleseine
 Nihon Chouou Keiba
 Oriko card
 Shiseidou City Veil

Publications

Photobooks

Essay books 
 2002 – 
 2003 – 
 2013 –

References

External links 
 Official blog 
 Up-Front Works discography page – Up-Front Works 
 

 

1973 births
Living people
Morning Musume members
Hello! Project solo singers
Puripuri Pink members
People from Kyoto Prefecture
Japanese actresses
Japanese idols
Dream Morning Musume members
Enka singers
Musicians from Kyoto Prefecture